Stanley H. Watts (August 30, 1911 – April 6, 2000) was an American basketball coach.  He served as the head basketball coach at Brigham Young University (BYU) from 1949 to 1972.  The Murray, Utah native was inducted into the Naismith Memorial Basketball Hall of Fame in 1986.

Watts became the sixth coach in history to win 100 games in his first five years. Watts' BYU teams were disciplined and well-drilled units that favored an up-tempo style and relentless defensive pressure. In 23 seasons, Watts compiled a 371–254 (.594) record and established a strong basketball tradition and a national athletic identity for the school representing the Church of Jesus Christ of Latter Day Saints. His Cougars teams won eight conference titles, appeared in 11 postseason tournaments, and captured the 1951 and 1966 National Invitation Tournament championships.

Watts began his coaching career in 1938 at Millard High, then coached Dixie Junior College from 1941 to 1945 and Jordan High School from 1945 to 1947. Watts was chosen as BYU's freshman coach in 1947 and inherited the varsity team in 1949. Watts' book, Developing an Offensive Attack in Basketball (1958), became a standard manual on the fast break offense. From 1965 to 1966, Watts' "Runnin' Cougars" scored more than 100 points 21 times and at least 95 points 32 times. Watts' teaching skills were in constant demand at coaching clinics across the nation and in Europe, the Far East and South Africa. Watts served his coaching organization, the National Association of Basketball Coaches (NABC), on numerous committees. He served on the Board of Directors from 1958 to 1968 and as president in 1970.

Head coaching record

College basketball

References

External links
 

1911 births
2000 deaths
American Latter Day Saints
American men's basketball coaches
American men's basketball players
Basketball coaches from Utah
Basketball players from Utah
BYU Cougars athletic directors
BYU Cougars baseball coaches
BYU Cougars men's basketball coaches
BYU Cougars men's basketball players
College men's basketball head coaches in the United States
Utah Tech University people
Utah Tech Trailblazers men's basketball coaches
High school basketball coaches in the United States
Naismith Memorial Basketball Hall of Fame inductees
National Collegiate Basketball Hall of Fame inductees
People from Murray, Utah